Moperone (Luvatren, since discontinued) is a typical antipsychotic of the butyrophenone class which is marketed in Japan for the treatment of schizophrenia. It is an antagonist for the D2 (Ki 0.7–1.9 nM), D3 (Ki 0.1–1 nM), and 5-HT2A (Ki 52 nM) receptors. It also has a high binding affinity for the sigma receptors.

References 

Abandoned drugs
Tertiary alcohols
Butyrophenone antipsychotics
Fluoroarenes
4-Phenylpiperidines
Typical antipsychotics
4-Tolyl compounds